A special election was held in the U.S. state of Minnesota on March 19, 2019, to elect a new member for District 11B in the Minnesota House of Representatives, caused by the resignation of Republican Jason Rarick effective on February 12, 2019, after winning a special election to the Minnesota Senate. A primary election was held on March 5, 2019, to nominate a Republican candidate. Nathan Nelson, the Republican nominee, won the special election.

Background
District 11B includes most of Pine County and the eastern half of Kanabec County in east-central Minnesota. Rarick began representing the district after winning election in 2014, defeating Democratic–Farmer–Labor (DFL) incumbent Tim Faust. In the last election in 2018, Rarick won with 60 percent of the vote.

Candidates
The candidate filing period was from February 15 to February 19, 2019.

Republican Party of Minnesota 
District 11B Republican delegates held a convention to endorse a candidate in Mora on February 19, 2019, where Clover Township board supervisor Nathan Nelson won the endorsement. Afterwards, with the exception of Ayrlahn Johnson, all other candidates withdrew from seeking the Republican nomination.

Declared 
 Ayrlahn Johnson, substitute teacher
 Nathan Nelson, farmer; Clover Township board supervisor

Withdrawn 
 Michael Cummins, real estate broker; candidate for the U.S. House in 2008 and the Minnesota Senate in 2010 and 2016
 Traci LeBrun, newspaper editor; small business owner
 Carl Pederson, mayor of Pine City since 2015
 Joe Wolf

Minnesota Democratic–Farmer–Labor Party 
District 11B DFL delegates held a convention to endorse a candidate in Hinckley on February 18, 2019. Hinckley city council member Tim Burkhardt won the endorsement over Oliver Dykstra, who agreed to abide by the endorsement and withdrew his candidacy.

Declared 
 Tim Burkhardt, member of the Hinckley city council; District 11B DFL nominee in 2018

Withdrawn 
 Oliver Dykstra

Primary election

Results

Results

See also
 2019 Minnesota Senate District 11 special election
 List of special elections to the Minnesota House of Representatives

References

External links
 Elections & Voting - Minnesota Secretary of State
 District 11B special election - Minnesota Secretary of State 

Minnesota House of Representatives District 11B special election
Minnesota special elections